Games for Health are games that aim to either promote health or to prevent, diagnose or treat (chronic) diseases. These games, which are generally considered serious games, aim to influence health outcomes by increasing the user's knowledge and changing their behaviors through play.

Conference
Games for Health is also the name of series of conferences made possible in part by funding from the Robert Wood Johnson Foundation as part of their Pioneer Portfolio program. Games for Health is a part of the Serious Games Initiative.

The conference has received media attention in recent years for its work to showcase the health and research implications of video games.

 Sep 2004   Madison, Wisconsin
 Sep 2005   Baltimore, Maryland
 Sep 2006   Baltimore, Maryland
 May 2008   Baltimore, Maryland
 June 2009  Boston, Massachusetts
 May 2010   Boston, Massachusetts

Journal 
Games for Health is also a peer-reviewed journal, which was launched in February 2012.

See also
Exergaming

References

External links
 Games for Health Conference Homepage
 Games for Health Conference Europe Homepage
 Games for Health Journal Homepage

Health education in the United States